Naturally occurring ruthenium (44Ru) is composed of seven stable isotopes. Additionally, 27 radioactive isotopes have been discovered. Of these radioisotopes, the most stable are 106Ru, with a half-life of 373.59 days; 103Ru, with a half-life of 39.26 days and 97Ru, with a half-life of 2.9 days.

Twenty-four other radioisotopes have been characterized with atomic weights ranging from 86.95 u (87Ru) to 119.95 u (120Ru). Most of these have half-lives that are less than five minutes, except 94Ru (half-life: 51.8 minutes), 95Ru (half-life: 1.643 hours), and 105Ru (half-life: 4.44 hours).

The primary decay mode before the most abundant isotope, 102Ru, is electron capture and the primary mode after is beta emission. The primary decay product before 102Ru is technetium and the primary product after is rhodium.

Because of the very high volatility of ruthenium tetroxide ruthenium radioactive isotopes with their relative short half-life are considered as the second most hazardous gaseous isotopes after iodine-131 in case of release by a nuclear accident. The two most important isotopes of ruthenium in case of nuclear accident are these with the longest half-life: 103Ru (≥ 1 month) and 106Ru (≥ 1 year).

List of isotopes 

|-
| 87Ru
| style="text-align:right" | 44
| style="text-align:right" | 43
| 86.94918(64)#
| 50# ms [>1.5 µs]
| β+
| 87Tc
| 1/2−#
|
|
|-
| 88Ru
| style="text-align:right" | 44
| style="text-align:right" | 44
| 87.94026(43)#
| 1.3(3) s [1.2(+3−2) s]
| β+
| 88Tc
| 0+
|
|
|-
| 89Ru
| style="text-align:right" | 44
| style="text-align:right" | 45
| 88.93611(54)#
| 1.38(11) s
| β+
| 89Tc
| (7/2)(+#)
|
|
|-
| 90Ru
| style="text-align:right" | 44
| style="text-align:right" | 46
| 89.92989(32)#
| 11.7(9) s
| β+
| 90Tc
| 0+
|
|
|-
| 91Ru
| style="text-align:right" | 44
| style="text-align:right" | 47
| 90.92629(63)#
| 7.9(4) s
| β+
| 91Tc
| (9/2+)
|
|
|-
| rowspan=3 style="text-indent:1em" | 91mRu
| rowspan=3 colspan="3" style="text-indent:2em" | 80(300)# keV
| rowspan=3|7.6(8) s
| β+ (>99.9%)
| 91Tc
| rowspan=3|(1/2−)
| rowspan=3|
| rowspan=3|
|-
| IT (<.1%)
| 91Ru
|-
| β+, p (<.1%)
| 90Mo
|-
| 92Ru
| style="text-align:right" | 44
| style="text-align:right" | 48
| 91.92012(32)#
| 3.65(5) min
| β+
| 92Tc
| 0+
|
|
|-
| 93Ru
| style="text-align:right" | 44
| style="text-align:right" | 49
| 92.91705(9)
| 59.7(6) s
| β+
| 93Tc
| (9/2)+
|
|
|-
| rowspan=3 style="text-indent:1em" | 93m1Ru
| rowspan=3 colspan="3" style="text-indent:2em" | 734.40(10) keV
| rowspan=3|10.8(3) s
| β+ (78%)
| 93Tc
| rowspan=3|(1/2)−
| rowspan=3| 
| rowspan=3|
|-
| IT (22%)
| 93Ru
|-
| β+, p (.027%)
| 92Mo
|-
| style="text-indent:1em" | 93m2Ru
| colspan="3" style="text-indent:2em" | 2082.6(9) keV
| 2.20(17) µs
|
|
| (21/2)+
|
|
|-
| 94Ru
| style="text-align:right" | 44
| style="text-align:right" | 50
| 93.911360(14)
| 51.8(6) min
| β+
| 94Tc
| 0+
|
|
|-
| style="text-indent:1em" | 94mRu
| colspan="3" style="text-indent:2em" | 2644.55(25) keV
| 71(4) µs
|
|
| (8+)
|
|
|-
| 95Ru
| style="text-align:right" | 44
| style="text-align:right" | 51
| 94.910413(13)
| 1.643(14) h
| β+
| 95Tc
| 5/2+
|
|
|-
| 96Ru
| style="text-align:right" | 44
| style="text-align:right" | 52
| 95.907598(8)
| colspan=3 align=center|Observationally Stable
| 0+
| 0.0554(14)
|
|-
| 97Ru
| style="text-align:right" | 44
| style="text-align:right" | 53
| 96.907555(9)
| 2.791(4) d
| β+
| 97mTc
| 5/2+
|
|
|-
| 98Ru
| style="text-align:right" | 44
| style="text-align:right" | 54
| 97.905287(7)
| colspan=3 align=center|Stable
| 0+
| 0.0187(3)
|
|-
| 99Ru
| style="text-align:right" | 44
| style="text-align:right" | 55
| 98.9059393(22)
| colspan=3 align=center|Stable
| 5/2+
| 0.1276(14)
|
|-
| 100Ru
| style="text-align:right" | 44
| style="text-align:right" | 56
| 99.9042195(22)
| colspan=3 align=center|Stable
| 0+
| 0.1260(7)
|
|-
| 101Ru
| style="text-align:right" | 44
| style="text-align:right" | 57
| 100.9055821(22)
| colspan=3 align=center|Stable
| 5/2+
| 0.1706(2)
|
|-
| style="text-indent:1em" | 101mRu
| colspan="3" style="text-indent:2em" | 527.56(10) keV
| 17.5(4) µs
|
|
| 11/2−
|
|
|-
| 102Ru
| style="text-align:right" | 44
| style="text-align:right" | 58
| 101.9043493(22)
| colspan=3 align=center|Stable
| 0+
| 0.3155(14)
|
|-
| 103Ru
| style="text-align:right" | 44
| style="text-align:right" | 59
| 102.9063238(22)
| 39.26(2) d
| β−
| 103Rh
| 3/2+
|
|
|-
| style="text-indent:1em" | 103mRu
| colspan="3" style="text-indent:2em" | 238.2(7) keV
| 1.69(7) ms
| IT
| 103Ru
| 11/2−
|
|
|-
| 104Ru
| style="text-align:right" | 44
| style="text-align:right" | 60
| 103.905433(3)
| colspan=3 align=center|Observationally Stable
| 0+
| 0.1862(27)
|
|-
| 105Ru
| style="text-align:right" | 44
| style="text-align:right" | 61
| 104.907753(3)
| 4.44(2) h
| β−
| 105Rh
| 3/2+
|
|
|-
| 106Ru
| style="text-align:right" | 44
| style="text-align:right" | 62
| 105.907329(8)
| 373.59(15) d
| β−
| 106Rh
| 0+
|
|
|-
| 107Ru
| style="text-align:right" | 44
| style="text-align:right" | 63
| 106.90991(13)
| 3.75(5) min
| β−
| 107Rh
| (5/2)+
|
|
|-
| 108Ru
| style="text-align:right" | 44
| style="text-align:right" | 64
| 107.91017(12)
| 4.55(5) min
| β−
| 108Rh
| 0+
|
|
|-
| 109Ru
| style="text-align:right" | 44
| style="text-align:right" | 65
| 108.91320(7)
| 34.5(10) s
| β−
| 109Rh
| (5/2+)#
|
|
|-
| 110Ru
| style="text-align:right" | 44
| style="text-align:right" | 66
| 109.91414(6)
| 11.6(6) s
| β−
| 110Rh
| 0+
|
|
|-
| 111Ru
| style="text-align:right" | 44
| style="text-align:right" | 67
| 110.91770(8)
| 2.12(7) s
| β−
| 111Rh
| (5/2+)
|
|
|-
| 112Ru
| style="text-align:right" | 44
| style="text-align:right" | 68
| 111.91897(8)
| 1.75(7) s
| β−
| 112Rh
| 0+
|
|
|-
| 113Ru
| style="text-align:right" | 44
| style="text-align:right" | 69
| 112.92249(8)
| 0.80(5) s
| β−
| 113Rh
| (5/2+)
|
|
|-
| style="text-indent:1em" | 113mRu
| colspan="3" style="text-indent:2em" | 130(18) keV
| 510(30) ms
|
|
| (11/2−)
|
|
|-
| rowspan=2|114Ru
| rowspan=2 style="text-align:right" | 44
| rowspan=2 style="text-align:right" | 70
| rowspan=2|113.92428(25)#
| rowspan=2|0.53(6) s
| β− (>99.9%)
| 114Rh
| rowspan=2|0+
| rowspan=2|
| rowspan=2|
|-
| β−, n (<.1%)
| 113Rh
|-
| rowspan=2|115Ru
| rowspan=2 style="text-align:right" | 44
| rowspan=2 style="text-align:right" | 71
| rowspan=2|114.92869(14)
| rowspan=2|740(80) ms
| β− (>99.9%)
| 115Rh
| rowspan=2|
| rowspan=2|
| rowspan=2|
|-
| β−, n (<.1%)
| 114Rh
|-
| 116Ru
| style="text-align:right" | 44
| style="text-align:right" | 72
| 115.93081(75)#
| 400# ms [>300 ns]
| β−
| 116Rh
| 0+
|
|
|-
| 117Ru
| style="text-align:right" | 44
| style="text-align:right" | 73
| 116.93558(75)#
| 300# ms [>300 ns]
| β−
| 117Rh
|
|
|
|-
| 118Ru
| style="text-align:right" | 44
| style="text-align:right" | 74
| 117.93782(86)#
| 200# ms [>300 ns]
| β−
| 118Rh
| 0+
|
|
|-
| 119Ru
| style="text-align:right" | 44
| style="text-align:right" | 75
| 118.94284(75)#
| 170# ms [>300 ns]
|
|
|
|
|
|-
| 120Ru
| style="text-align:right" | 44
| style="text-align:right" | 76
| 119.94531(86)#
| 80# ms [>300 ns]
|
|
| 0+
|
|

 Geologically exceptional samples are known in which the isotopic composition lies outside the reported range. The uncertainty in the atomic mass may exceed the stated value for such specimens.
 In September 2017 an estimated amount of 100 to 300 TBq (0.3 to 1 g) of 106Ru was released in Russia, probably in the Ural region. It was, after ruling out release from a reentering satellite, concluded that the source  is to be found either in nuclear fuel cycle facilities or radioactive source production. In France levels up to 0.036mBq/m3 of air were measured. It is estimated that over distances of the order of a few tens of kilometres around the location of the release levels may exceed the limits for non-dairy foodstuffs.

References 

 Isotope masses from:

 Isotopic compositions and standard atomic masses from:

 Half-life, spin, and isomer data selected from the following sources.

 
Ruthenium
Ruthenium